Koton may refer to:
 Koton (dog), German Shepherd dog appearing in films including K-9
 Koton (company), Turkish clothing company
Koton, Sakhalin Oblast location in Sakhalin involved in Evacuation of Karafuto and Kuriles